The following list includes notable people who were born or have lived in Grand Forks, North Dakota.

Arts and entertainment 

 Liz Anderson (1927–2011), country singer; grew up in Grand Forks
 Lynn Anderson (1947–2015), country singer; born in Grand Forks
 Maxwell Anderson, Pulitzer Prize-winning playwright, author, poet, reporter, lyricist
 Tom Brosseau, singer and songwriter, folk guitarist
 Tony Fontane, gospel singer
 Joel Harlow, Academy Award-winning makeup effects artist
 Kam Heskin, actress
 Ezra Kire, guitarist for Choking Victim and Leftöver Crack
 Nicole Linkletter, winner of the 5th Cycle of America's Next Top Model
 Stuart McDonald, former editorial cartoonist, Grand Forks Herald
 Dickie Peterson, founding member of heavy metal rock band Blue Cheer ("Summertime Blues")
 Alan Ritchson, actor, singer, model
 James Rosenquist, artist
 Richard St. Clair, classical composer
 Corin Tucker, singer songwriter in Sleator-Kinney
 Natalie West, actress, Roseanne

Business 

 Thomas D. Campbell, 1928 Time Magazine "Man of the Year," and largest U.S. farmer at the time
 Ralph Engelstad, Las Vegas casino owner, philanthropist
 Andrew Freeman, invented the block heater; manager of Minnkota Power Cooperative
 Sally J. Smith, president and CEO of Buffalo Wild Wings

Law, politics, and government 

 Rick Clayburgh, North Dakota Tax Commissioner
 Ronald Davies, federal judge, ordered the integration of Little Rock Central High School
 Jerry Gaetz, North Dakota state senator
 Jon Godfread, North Dakota Insurance Commissioner
 James D. Gronna, North Dakota Secretary of State
 Gary Johnson, state congressman for Wisconsin
 Howard A. Knutson, Minnesota state legislator and lawyer
 Walter Maddock, 15th governor of North Dakota
 Leonard Peltier, American Indian activist; convicted of murder in the deaths of two FBI agents
 Dale V. Sandstrom, justice on the North Dakota Supreme Court
 Arthur G. Sorlie, 14th governor of North Dakota

Literature and journalism 

 James M. Edie, philosopher
 Marilyn Hagerty, author and writer for the Grand Forks Herald
 Al McIntosh, newspaper editor, columns were featured in The War
 Jennie Shortridge, novelist
 Edward Kramer Thompson, editor of Life
 Era Bell Thompson, editor of Ebony
 George H. Walsh, newspaper editor, publisher, founding role with the University of North Dakota
 Walter Wangerin, Jr., author of religious novels and children's books

Military 

 Charles W. Lindberg, marine, part of the first raising the flag on Iwo Jima

Science 

 Mancur Olson, economist, social scientist

Sports 

 Brooks Bollinger, American football player
 T. J. Frier, American football player
 Andrew Hampsten, champion cyclist
 Virgil Hill, boxer, Olympic silver medalist (1984)
 Ken Hunt, Major League Baseball outfielder
 Tim Johnson, Major League Baseball player and manager
 Tyler Johnson. basketball player with the NBL's Brisbane Bullets
 Jocelyne Lamoureux, women's ice hockey Olympic gold medalist
 Monique Lamoureux, women's ice hockey Olympic gold medalist
 Roger Maris, right fielder with the New York Yankees, hit record-breaking 61 home runs in 1961
 Doug McDermott, basketball player with the NBA's San Antonio Spurs
 Lute Olson, NCAA Champion college basketball coach of Arizona Wildcats
 Tim Olson, baseball player with the Colorado Rockies
 Ryan Potulny, assistant coach for the  University of Minnesota men's ice hockey
 Cliff Purpur, first North Dakota native to become a NHL player
 Andy Schneider, defenseman with the Adler Mannheim
 Andrew Towne, member of the team that completed the first human-powered transit of the Drake Passage

See also
List of University of North Dakota people

References

Grand Forks, North Dakota
Grand Forks